Bernard Fritz (born 5 October 1953) is a former professional tennis player from France.

Fritz enjoyed most of his tennis success while playing doubles. During his career, he finished runner-up in 4 doubles events. He achieved a career-high doubles ranking of world No. 106 in 1984. He reached a career-high singles ranking of world No. 91 in 1983.

Career finals

Doubles (4 runners-up)

External links
 
 

French male tennis players
Tennis players from Marseille
1953 births
Living people